Lim Chong King (Chinese: 林忠庆, born 6 May 2000) is a Malaysian badminton player.

Career 
Exposed to badminton at the age of seven, King was selected for the badminton team of Bukit Jalil Sports School. He joined the national team at 18.

In August 2019, Kingmcompeted in the Hellas Open where he won his first international title by defeating Aidil Sholeh with a score of (8–21, 21–13, 21–15). In September, he lost the Sydney International tournament to Japan's Yusuke Onodera.

King was a part of the first Malaysian to win the gold medal in the 2022 Badminton Asia Team Championships.

Achievements

BWF International Challenge/Series (1 title, 1 runner-up) 
Men's singles

  BWF International Series tournament

References

External links 
 

2000 births
Living people
Sportspeople from Kuala Lumpur
Malaysian sportspeople of Chinese descent
Malaysian male badminton players
Southeast Asian Games silver medalists for Malaysia
Southeast Asian Games medalists in badminton
Competitors at the 2019 Southeast Asian Games
Competitors at the 2021 Southeast Asian Games
21st-century Malaysian people